Kern National Forest was established by the U.S. Forest Service in California on July 1, 1910 with  from a portion of Sequoia National Forest and other lands.  On July 1, 1915 the entire forest was transferred back to Sequoia and the name was discontinued.

References

External links
Forest History Society
Forest History Society:Listing of the National Forests of the United States Text from Davis, Richard C., ed. Encyclopedia of American Forest and Conservation History. New York: Macmillan Publishing Company for the Forest History Society, 1983. Vol. II, pp. 743-788.

Former National Forests of California